Rebecca Ferdinando is an English actress and model, best known for playing Mary in the British gangster film [[Bonded by Blood (film)|Bonded by Blood]].

Career
Ferdinando attended the Sylvia Young Theatre School from a young age before studying drama at Middlesex University where she gained a BA Honours degree.

Rebecca began her acting career as a child when she appeared in roles for television such as Holby City, The Last Detective and Silent Witness.

When she was eighteen she was signed by some of London's top modelling and commercial agents which led her to work for some famous brands and campaigns such as Vivienne Westwood. This work funded her through drama school  and then presenting on Channel Five's The Great Big British Quiz, while modelling for shows like This Morning, The Alan Titchmarsh Show and GMTV.

Since graduating she has played roles including as Dorrabella for BBC's Elgar's Enigma, Beanie in the feature film Shank; directed by Mo Ali, Mary alongside Tamer Hassan in Bonded By Blood and most recently she played Cheryl in Outside Bet which was released on 24 April 2012.

Television
 Holby City
 The Last Detective
 Silent Witness
 The Great British Quiz, presenter 
 Elgar's Enigma, Dorrabella
 Russell Howard's Good News, Baywatch babe (Series 6 Episode 1)
 The Johnny and Inel Show, Ugly Sister (Getting Serious 2013): Princess Aurora (Dreams 2013)

Films

References

External links
 
 Rebecca's home page
 Outside bet film premiere 24 April 2012 (video)
 The Spunx Effect (video), Russell Howard featuring Rebecca
 ODDcast PODcast Xtra - Rebecca Ferdinando (Audio Link)
 ODDcast PODcast UK - White Collar Hooligan Special (Episode 48 - The HooliganCAST)

1985 births
Living people
People from Enfield, London
Alumni of the Sylvia Young Theatre School
English film actresses
English television actresses
21st-century English actresses